Social pornography (Norwegian: sosialpornografi) is a term used in Norway and elsewhere to describe a type of journalism through which persons are exposed in an intimate way, especially in matters or situations of private or tragic nature, as a form of entertainment to satisfy a need to "watch" (akin to "peeping"). Social pornography often has no other purpose than entertainment, and can be considered an example of invasion of privacy. The term is especially used when concerning persons less able to safeguard their own interests and understand the consequences of making themselves available for the press in this way, i.e. children or people with few resources.

It can be controversial where the limits go for what constitutes social pornography and what is deemed to be newsworthy. For example, a news coverage may transcend to social pornography depending on what details the media choose to make public or focus on. It has been asserted that the media coverage of terror attacks at times are of a social pornographic nature, which can cause an excessive fear of terrorism.

Some reality TV shows are considered to be social pornography, for example Big Brother and Ex on the Beach.

Psychologists have stated that some "help TV" programs border on social pornography. Examples of such types of programs are where the participant(s) are compulsive hoarders, have embarrassing illnesses or economic problems.

See also 
 Inspiration porn
 Poverty porn
 Rubbernecking
 Sensationalism

References

External links 
 Sosialpolitikk eller sosialpornografi? En analyse av sosialpolitiske reportasjer i pressen (1984) av Roel Puijk, Helge Østbye og Else Øyen, Universitetsforlaget. (English title: Social Policy or Social Pornography? – University of Bergen)

Social ethics
Journalism